Sir Ferdinando Gorges ( – 24 May 1647) was a naval and military commander and governor of the important port of Plymouth in England. He was involved in Essex's Rebellion against the Queen, but escaped punishment by testifying against the main conspirators. His early involvement in English trade with and settlement of North America as well as his efforts in founding the Province of Maine in 1622 earned him the title of the "Father of English Colonization in North America," even though Gorges himself never set foot in the New World.

Origins
Ferdinando Gorges was born between 1565 and 1568, probably in Clerkenwell, in Middlesex where the family maintained their London town house, but possibly at the family's manor of Wraxall, in Somerset. He was the second son of Edward Gorges of Wraxall, by his wife Cicely Lygon. The circumstances of his father's death aged 31 suggested to Baxter (Gorges's first biographer) that Ferdinando was born at about the time of his father's death on 29 August 1568. Edward Gorges, however, evidently realizing that his illness was fatal, prepared his will on 10 August 1568, (and proved on 17 September of the same year) in which Edward bequeathed to Ferdinando a 23-ounce gold watch and devised to him the manor of Birdcombe, Wraxal, for a term of 24 years. The terms of the testamentary gifts led an earlier memorialist to conclude that Ferdinando had been born sometime between 1565 and 1567.

His Ancestry 

Ferdinando Gorges was by blood in the male line a member of the Russell family of Kingston Russell, Dorset and of Dyrham in Gloucestershire, an early member of which was Sir John Russell (died c. 1224) of Kingston Russell, a household knight of King John (1199–1216), and of the young King Henry III (1216–1272), to whom he also acted as steward. However, the last male of the ancient Anglo-Norman Gorges family, about to die childless, bequeathed his estates, including Wraxall, to Theobald Russell, a younger son of his sister Eleanor Russell, on condition that he should adopt the name and arms of Gorges. Ferdinando was a descendant of this Theobald Russell "Gorges".

The Gorges family arrived in England with the Norman invasion. The male line of the Gorges family died out in 1331 on the death of Ralph de Gorges, 2nd Baron Gorges (d.1331), of Knighton, Isle of Wight. They were said to have lived in Somersetshire from the time of King Henry I and held their estates in Wraxall since the time of King Edward II. The Gorges were recipients of many royal appointments and privileges since Edward's time.

Ferdinando's great-great-grandfather married the eldest daughter of John Howard, 1st Duke of Norfolk, from which connection they claim  royal descent. Ferdinando's father Edward Gorges, as first born, became the heir of the family estate in Wraxal when his father died in 1558 when he was 21. Notwithstanding the family tradition in royal offices, neither Edward nor his father Edmund took part in public affairs (the early deaths of both of them may have been a partial explanation).

Ferdinando's mother was Cecily Lygon, a daughter of William Lygon of Madresfield, Worcestershire (1512-1567), (whose ancestors' connection with the throne could be traced back to King Richard II), by his wife Eleanor Denys, a daughter of Sir William Denys (d.1533) of Dyrham, High Sheriff of Gloucestershire, whose family was the heir of the Russells of Dyrham, a descendant of which family in a direct male line was Ferdinando Gorges. Among their descendants were the Earls Beauchamp. Ferdinando Gorges was named after his mother's brother, Ferdinando Lygon. After the death of Edward Gorges, Cecily married John Vivian of Brydges.

Ferdinando's only sibling was his older brother Edward, who was baptised at Wraxall on 5 September 1564. Edward entered Hart's College, Oxford, in 1582.

Career
Very little documentation exists regarding his early life and education. He was brought up at Nailsea Court at Kenn near Wraxall. Although as far as is known Ferdinando had no direct connection with the Court in his youth, he could not have been impervious to two great cultural currents of the time: the growing resistance to the absolute power of the monarchy, particularly in ecclesiastical matter, sometimes subsumed under the concept of "Puritanism", and the beginnings of English exploration and exploitation of the Western Hemisphere, the latter especially owing to his distant family connections with Humphrey Gilbert and his half-brother Walter Raleigh.

Gorges's military career
No documentary evidence records Gorges's activities before 1587 (when he was around 20), but because in that year he is referred to as a captain, it is probable that he took up the profession of arms several years before then, perhaps in his mid-teens (not uncommon in England at the time). It is likely that he was engaged in active duty shortly after the outbreak of the Anglo-Spanish War in 1585. 

In 1587, he was one of the "several eminent chieftains" commanding the 800 soldiers sent from Flushing by Sir William Russell to aid the Earl of Leicester's attempt to relieve the Siege of Sluis laid by the Spanish Governor General of the Netherlands, whose revolt against the Spanish Habsburg rule England had pledged to aid. Gorges fought under the command of Lord Willoughby, whose family he developed a close connection with. 

It is unknown whether he was captured during that engagement or later, but by September 1588 he was listed as among the prisoners at Lisle, for his name is among those English prisoners who friends in England petitioned to have Spanish prisoner exchanged for. In 1589 Gorges was wounded at the siege of Paris. He was knighted at the siege of Rouen in 1591. He was rewarded for his services by the post of Governor of the Fort at Plymouth, which he held for many years. 

During the Spanish Armada of 1597 Gorges was able to raise the alarm that enabled the defence of the country, but autumn storms made sure that the Spanish fleet was dispersed.

In 1601, he became involved in the Essex Conspiracy and later testified against its leader, Robert Devereux, 2nd Earl of Essex.

Colonization efforts in North America
His interest in colonization was invoked when Captain George Weymouth presented him with three captured American Indians. According to Gorges one of these captives was Tisquantum or "Squanto" of the Patuxet, but this claim has been disputed by historians. 

In 1607, as a shareholder in the Plymouth Company, he helped fund the failed Popham Colony, in present-day Phippsburg, Maine.

In 1622, Gorges received a land patent, along with John Mason, from the crown's Plymouth Council for New England for the Province of Maine, the original boundaries of which were between the Merrimack and Kennebec rivers. "Ye Province of Maine" had its birth in this charter, dated 10 August 1622, in the reign of England's King James. A reconfirmed and enhanced 1639 charter from England's King Charles I, gave Sir Ferdinando Gorges increased powers over this new province and stated that it "shall forever hereafter, be called and named the PROVINCE OR COUNTIE OF MAINE, and not by any other name or names whatsoever..." 

In 1629, he and Mason divided the colony, with Mason's portion south of the Piscataqua River becoming the Province of New Hampshire. Gorges and his nephew established Maine's first court system. Capt. Christopher Levett, early English explorer of the New England coast, was an agent for Gorges, as well as a member for the Plymouth Council for New England. 
Levett's attempt to establish a colony in Maine ultimately failed, and he died aboard ship returning to England after meeting with Governor John Winthrop in the Massachusetts Bay Colony in 1630.

Gorges's son was Robert Gorges, Governor-General of New England from 1623 to 1624. But Robert Gorges was seen with some suspicion by American colonists, who were sceptical of Gorges' almost feudal idea of governance and settlement, and ultimately Gorges returned to England. In the 1630s Ferdinando Gorges attempted to revive the moribund claims of the Plymouth Company. In concert with colonists banished from the Massachusetts Bay Colony, he formally questioned the issuance of its royal charter in 1632, and forwarded complaints and charges made by the disaffected colonists to the Privy Council of Charles I. His efforts were ultimately unsuccessful.

Marriages and children
He married four times:
Firstly in 1589 at St. Margaret's, Westminster to Ann Bell (d. 1620), a daughter of Edward Bell of Writtle, Essex, by whom he  had two sons and two daughters:
John Gorges;
Robert Gorges;
Ellen Gorges;
Honoria Gorges, who died young. 
Secondly in 1621, he married Mary Fulford, 3rd daughter of Sir Thomas Fulford (1553–1610) of Great Fulford in Devon, and widow of Thomas Achims (alias Asham) of Hall, in Cornwall. 
Thirdly in 1627, at Ladock in Cornwall, to Elizabeth Gorges (d. 1629), who died a few weeks after the marriage, a daughter of Tristam Gorges of St. Budeaux (a direct descendant in the male line of the Norman Gorges family) and widow firstly of Edward Courteney (d.1622) of Landrake and of Trethurffe, Ladock, both in Cornwall (descended from the Courtenay Earls of Devon), and secondly of William Bligh.
Fourthly, at Wraxall in 1629, to Elizabeth Gorges, Lady Smyth, widow of Sir Hugh Smyth of Ashton Court (near Wraxall) and daughter of Sir Thomas Gorges and Helena, Marchioness of Northampton.

Death and succession
Sir Ferdinando Gorges died on 24 May 1647, at his wife's home in Long Ashton (then known as Ashton-Phillips), and is buried in the Smyth crypt, All Saint's Church, Long Ashton, without markings due to the circumstances of the time. His eldest son, John, inherited his Province of Maine, of which Robert, his younger son, had been for such a short time Governor. In May 1677 his grandson Ferdinando Gorges finally sold all his rights to Maine for £1,250, to the state of Massachusetts.

The epilogue to Sir Ferdinando Gorges' story is very brief. Although his grandson eventually accepted a paltry sum after many years of trying to secure the good name of his grandfather, he proceeded to acquire some validity of his grandfather's claims by the Puritans. This sale finally extinguished the interests of the Gorges family in those American lands which Sir Ferdinando had labored to develop as a proprietary province owing to a close relationship to the English Crown. New England was left to follow a very different destiny from that to which Sir Ferdinando had devoted so much of his life. It was not until 1820 that Maine achieved separate statehood.

See also

Fort Gorges

Notes, references and sources

Notes

References

Sources
  In three volumes, online, at archive.org, as follows: Volume 1 consists of Baxter's memoir of Sir Ferdinando Gorges and A briefe relation of the discovery and plantation of New England … (London: J. Haviland for W. Bladen, 1622). Volume 2 includes A briefe narration of the original undertakings of the advancement of plantation into the parts of American… by … Sir Ferdinando Gorges … (London: E. Brudenell, for N. Brook, 1658) as well as other works of Gorges and his son Thomas Gorges. Volume 3 is devoted to Gorges's letters and other papers, 1596–1646.
 The original article is

External links
 Capt. Christopher Levett, mentioned in History of Plymouth Plantation, 1620-1647 By William Bradford, Massachusetts
 "Sir Ferdinando Gorges (c. 1566-1647)", Maine Public Broadcasting Network

1560s births
1647 deaths
People from North Somerset (district)
Ferdinando
Russell of Dyrham family
Burials in Somerset
English MPs 1593
Members of the Parliament of England (pre-1707) for constituencies in Wales
Knights Bachelor